Leon Hazelton (June 24, 1876 – July 1, 1948) was an American golfer. He competed in the men's individual event at the 1904 Summer Olympics.

References

1876 births
1948 deaths
Amateur golfers
American male golfers
Olympic golfers of the United States
Golfers at the 1904 Summer Olympics
Golfers from Massachusetts
People from Granville, Massachusetts
Sportspeople from Hampden County, Massachusetts